Richland County is a county located in the U.S. state of Ohio. As of the 2020 census, the population was 124,936. Its county seat is Mansfield. The county was created in 1808 and later organized in 1813. It is named for the fertile soil found there.

Richland County is included in the Mansfield, OH Metropolitan Statistical Area as well as the Mansfield-Ashland-Bucyrus, OH Combined Statistical Area. The county is one of the six Metropolitan Statistical Areas that make up Northeast Ohio.

History
At its formation in 1806 Richland County encompassed a larger area. The land was mainly forest. Settlers cleared the land for farming and the population increased. When Ashland County was formed on 24 February 1846, most of its area was provided by townships annexed in whole (such as Green Township) or in part (Clear Creek, Milton and Mifflin townships) from eastern Richland County.

Geography

Adjacent counties
 Huron County (north)
 Ashland County (east)
 Knox County (south)
 Morrow County (southwest)
 Crawford County (west)

Demographics

2000 census
As of the census of 2000, there were 128,852 people, 49,534 households, and 34,277 families living in the county. The population density was 259 people per square mile (100/km2). There were 53,062 housing units at an average density of 107 per square mile (41/km2). The racial makeup of the county was 88.16% White, 9.43% Black or African American, 0.20% Native American, 0.51% Asian, 0.03% Pacific Islander, 0.38% from other races, and 1.28% from two or more races. 0.93% of the population were Hispanic or Latino of any race. 96.0% spoke English, 1.2% German and 1.2% Spanish as their first language.

There were 49,534 households, out of which 30.90% had children under the age of 18 living with them, 54.30% were married couples living together, 11.40% had a female householder with no husband present, and 30.80% were non-families. 26.50% of all households were made up of individuals, and 10.90% had someone living alone who was 65 years of age or older. The average household size was 2.47 and the average family size was 2.98.

In the county, the population was spread out, with 24.80% under the age of 18, 8.40% from 18 to 24, 28.60% from 25 to 44, 24.10% from 45 to 64, and 14.20% who were 65 years of age or older. The median age was 38 years. For every 100 females there were 101.30 males. For every 100 females age 18 and over, there were 99.30 males.

The median income for a household in the county was $37,397, and the median income for a family was $45,036. Males had a median income of $35,425 versus $22,859 for females. The per capita income for the county was $18,582. About 8.20% of families and 10.60% of the population were below the poverty line, including 15.30% of those under age 18 and 7.70% of those age 65 or over.

2010 census
As of the 2010 United States Census, there were 124,475 people, 48,921 households, and 32,510 families living in the county. The racial makeup of the county was 87.5% white, 9.4% black or African American, 0.6% Asian, 0.2% American Indian, 0.4% from other races, and 1.9% from two or more races. Those of Hispanic or Latino origin made up 1.4% of the population. In terms of ancestry, 30.6% were German, 13.3% were Irish, 12.6% were English, and 8.0% were American.

Of the 48,921 households, 29.9% had children under the age of 18 living with them, 49.7% were married couples living together, 12.5% had a female householder with no husband present, 33.5% were non-families, and 28.8% of all households were made up of individuals. The average household size was 2.40 and the average family size was 2.93. The median age was 40.9 years.

The median income for a household in the county was $42,664 and the median income for a family was $54,637. Males had a median income of $42,919 versus $31,228 for females. The per capita income for the county was $21,459. About 8.6% of families and 12.4% of the population were below the poverty line, including 18.9% of those under age 18 and 8.2% of those age 65 or over.

Politics
Prior to 1944, Richland County was Democratic in presidential elections, only voting for Republican candidates four times from 1856 to 1940. But starting with the 1944 election, it has become a Republican stronghold for presidential elections, with Lyndon B. Johnson being the only Democrat to win since then.

|}

Government

County officials
 Commissioners: Cliff Mears, Darrell Banks, Tony Vero
 Prosecutor: Gary Bishop
 Sheriff: J. Steve Sheldon
 Auditor: Patrick W. Dropsey
 Treasurer: Bart Hamilton
 Recorder:  Sarah Davis
 Clerk of Courts: Linda H. Frary
 Engineer:  Adam Gove
 Judges of the Court of Common Pleas: Phillip Naumoff and Brent Robinson
 Judges of the Domestic Relations Court: Heather Cockley
 Judges of the Juvenile Court: (William) Steven McKinley
 Judges of the Probate Court: Kelly Badnell

Communities

Cities
 Galion (part)
 Mansfield (county seat)
 Ontario
 Shelby

Villages
 Bellville
 Butler
 Crestline (part)
 Lexington
 Lucas
 Plymouth (part)
 Shiloh

Townships

 Bloominggrove
 Butler
 Cass
 Franklin
 Jackson
 Jefferson
 Madison
 Mifflin
 Monroe
 Perry
 Plymouth
 Sandusky
 Sharon
 Springfield
 Troy
 Washington
 Weller
 Worthington

Census-designated places
Lincoln Heights
Roseland

Unincorporated communities
 Bangorville
 Olivesburg

Ghost towns
 Newville
 Winchester

See also
 National Register of Historic Places listings in Richland County, Ohio

References

Further reading
 A.J. Baughman, A Centennial Biographical History of Richland County, Ohio. Chicago: Lewis Publishing Co., 1901.
 Abraham J. Baughman, History of Richland County, Ohio from 1808 to 1908: Also Biographical Sketches of Prominent Citizens of the County. In Two Volumes. Chicago: S.J. Clarke Publishing Co., 1908. [Volume 1] | Volume 2
 A.A. Graham, History of Richland County, Ohio (Including the Original Boundaries), Its Past and Present: Containing a Condensed Comprehensive History of Ohio, Including an Outline History of the Northwest; A Complete History of Richland County Including Its Townships, Cities, Towns and Villages, Schools, Churches, Societies, Industries, etc.; A History of Its Soldiers in the Late War; Portraits of Its Early Settlers and Prominent Men. Mansfield, Ohio: A.A. Graham Publishing Co., 1880.
 Biographical History of Richland County, Ohio, 1983. Lexington, OH: Richland County Genealogical Society, 1983.

External links
 County website

 
1808 establishments in Ohio
Populated places established in 1808